"Lamento Borincano" ('Puerto Rican Lament') is Rafael Hernández Marín's acclaimed composition in Puerto Rico's patriotic tradition. It takes its name from the free musical form Lament (Latin, lāmentor), and from Borinquen, an indigenous name for the island.  Hernández released the song in 1929 to illustrate the economic precariousness that had engulfed the Puerto Rican farmer since the late-1920s' Puerto Rico. It became an instantaneous hit in Puerto Rico and its popularity soon followed in many Latin American countries. Renowned international artists have sung it and featured it in their repertoire. 

In 2018, the original 1930 recording of the song by Canario y Su Grupo was selected for preservation in the National Recording Registry by the Library of Congress as being "culturally, historically, or artistically significant."

History
Hernandez composed the song while he lived in New York City, in Spanish Harlem.  That same year, he also wrote his masterpiece, "Preciosa". In 1947, Hernández returned to Puerto Rico to become an orchestra director at the government-owned WIPR Radio. "Lamento Borincano" was interpreted by dozens of artists and became an important part of Puerto Rican culture.

In 1929, 17-year-old Davilita met Rafael Hernández by chance.  Davilita got along quite well with Hernández Marín and was able to see the unfinished version of Hernandez's "Lamento Borincano".  Davilita asked Hernandez if he could record the song, but Hernandez thought that Davilita was too young and declined his request. The song was to be recorded by bandleader Manuel "Canario" Jiménez and his band. A musician named Ramon Quiroz became ill on the day of the recording, so Davilita ended up as lead vocals, with Fausto Delgado on backup.

Theme 
The song reflects the economic situation of the poor farmers in the Puerto Rico of the 1920s leading to the Great Depression. The  (diminutive of jíbaro) is a self-subsistence farmer and descendant of the intermixing of Taíno and Spaniards during the 16th century, who is the iconic reflection of the Puerto Rican people of the day. The  was a farmer-salesman who would also grow enough crops to sell in the town in order to purchase clothing and other goods for his family. The song speaks of the  walking with his donkey loaded with fruits and vegetables from his plot of land and heading to town to sell his load, but, disappointed to see the poverty prevalent even in town and unable to sell his load, the  returns home with his load unsold. The song thus ends with a sad, melancholic tone. The song does not name Puerto Rico by its modern name, instead using its former pre-Columbian name, Borinquen.

Chorus 
The chorus reads,

Though Rafael Hernández names the Puerto Rican poet José Gautier Benítez, some artists who have recorded the song have replaced his name with the word Gotier in place of Gautier.

Recordings

Following is a partial listing of recordings of the song by different artists.
 Marco Antonio Muñiz. Los Grandes Exitos de Marco Antonio Muñiz (RCA International, 1983) 
 Gilberto Monroig. Grandes Compositores, Rafael Hernandez: Volumen 3 (Polygram Records, 1994)
 Javier Solís. Personalidad: 20 Exitos (Sony Discos, 2002)
 Alfonso Ortiz Tirado. Original version of the song that became an immediate hit
 Paco de Lucía (duet with Ramón de Algeciras). En Hispanoamérica
 Chavela Vargas
 Franck Pourcel. Instrumental 
 Banda Los Escamilla. Album: La Consentida (2004)
 Conjunto Primavera
 Caetano Veloso
 Ginamaria Hidalgo
 Chelito de Castro (with Juan Carlos Coronel)
 Alfredo Kraus
 Plácido Domingo
 Óscar Chávez
 Pedro Infante
 Roberto Torres
 Toña la Negra
 Víctor Jara (Canto libre, 1970)
 Daniel Santos
 Estela Raval y Los 5 Latinos
 Radio Pirata Version Rock
 Marc Anthony (Valió la Pena, 2004)
 Los Indios Tabajaras Instrumental 
 Leo Marini 
 Facundo Cabral 
 Pedro Vargas 
 La Lupe (with Tito Puente) 
 Los Panchos 
 José Feliciano (with Luis Fonsi) (José Feliciano y Amigos, 2006)
 Enrique Cardenas Instrumental
 Marc Anthony, Ednita Nazario, Gilberto Santa Rosa and Ruth Fernández in the Banco Popular de Puerto Rico special, "Romance del Cumbanchero".
 Edith Márquez
 Ainhoa Arteta
 Cuco Sánchez
 Carlo Buti
 Luciano Tajoli
 William Cepeda Version Bomba
 Las Acevedo, a Tribute to Chavela Vargas La Chamana.
 Trio Los Andinos with Carmin Vega in "Los Andinos: Homenaje a Rafael Hernandez, con Carmin Vega". (2003, Disco Hit Productions)

References

External links 
 Latin Beat Magazine article on Lamento Borincano  
 Another link to the above article

1929 songs
Songs about Puerto Rico
Spanish-language songs
North American anthems
Boleros
Sony Discos singles
United States National Recording Registry recordings